Chroscice may refer to the following places in Poland:
Chrościce, Ciechanów County, Masovian Voivodeship
Chrościce, Mińsk County, Masovian Voivodeship
Chróścice, Opole Voivodeship